Melodiya is a Russian (formerly Soviet) record label. It was the state-owned major record company of the Soviet Union.

History

Melodiya was established in 1964 as the "All-Union Gramophone Record Firm of the USSR Ministry of Culture Melodiya". It utilized numerous recording studios and manufacturing facilities throughout the USSR as well as powerful centres of distribution and promotional strategies. The best selling format at the time was 33⅓ and 78 rpm vinyl records. By 1973, Melodiya released some 1,200 gramophone records with a total circulation of 190-200 million per year, in addition to 1 million compact cassettes per year, was exporting its production to more than 70 countries.

The label's production was dominated by classical music, music by Soviet composers and musicians, performances by Soviet theatre actors, and fairy tales for children. For example, Melodiya notably released performances of works by Tchaikovsky and Shostakovich. Melodiya also released some of the most successful western pop, jazz and rock records, including albums by ABBA, Paul McCartney, Boney M., Dave Grusin, Amanda Lear, and Bon Jovi. Melodiya also regularly released records by popular Soviet singers, among whom were Alla Pugacheva, Vladimir Vysotsky, Bulat Okudzhava, Sofia Rotaru, Mikhail Boyarsky, Valery Leontiev, Alexander Barykin, Vladimir Kuzmin, as well as Soviet rock groups Autograph, Mashina Vremeni, and Cruise.

In other countries, Melodiya recordings imported from the USSR were often sold under the label MK, which stood for Mezhdunarodnaya Kniga ("International Book", Russian: Μеждународная Книга). 

Being state owned until April 1989, the Soviet recording industry was able to apply a single numbering system to all its releases from 1933 onwards regardless of origin or place of manufacture. The number sequences for 78s and LPs are strictly chronological, from which it is possible to date many, though not all, releases using only the catalogue number 

Since 2008, some Melodiya records have been available to North American listeners through the Canadian classical label Analekta which is distributed by Entertainment One Distribution in the USA and Distribution Select in Canada.

Notable artists

Thousands of artists have appeared on the Melodiya label. For a partial list, see List of Melodiya artists.

See also
 List of record labels

References

External links

 Official site (in English)
 Collection of the first Soviet CDs (in Russian)

Russian record labels
Record labels established in 1964
Russian brands
Soviet brands
Soviet music
Mass media companies of the Soviet Union
Classical music record labels
Pop record labels
Jazz record labels
Rock record labels
1964 establishments in the Soviet Union
Folk record labels
Companies based in Moscow
State-owned record labels
Mass media companies of Russia